Tahurwaili was a king of the Hittites (Middle Kingdom), c. early 15th century BC (middle chronology) or mid 15th century BC (short chronology timeline). He was a cousin of the King Telipinu.

Family 
As a first cousin of Telipinu, must have been the son of one of Ammuna's brothers. This would have made him a direct male descendant of Zidanta I, so that his royal blood stemmed ultimately from Zidanta’s wife. It was tenuous, but the blood line was carried on.

Reign 

Tahurwaili is not mentioned in any of many "offering lists", but his existence is confirmed by the seal impressions found in Hattussa. He ruled sometime between Telepinu and Zidanta II, but otherwise the placement of his rule in the sequence of kings is uncertain. Often he is put after Aluwamna and even Hantili II, based on the style of his seal (see, for example, History of the Hittites), but such decision is speculative. Since he is mentioned in one of the Telepinu's letters (KUB 26:77) and is supposed to be Telepinu's cousin, it makes sense to assume that he ruled right after Telepinu. Here is the reasoning by Bin-Nun: we know that Aluwamna was exiled by Telepinu, so it would be difficult for him to come to the throne right after Telepinu's death. Therefore, it makes sense to assume that the usurper could come to power for a while. Putting Tahurwaili's reign after Hantili II (son of Aluwamna, who is son-in-law of Telepinu) means moving Tahurwaili at least two generations down the time line.

Tahurwaili made a parity treaty with Eheya of Kizzuwatna. Its terms were very similar to those between Paddatiššu and Hantili II. These kings are usually assumed, but neither of the treaties names a Hittite king.

See also

 History of the Hittites

References

External links
Reign of Tahurwaili at Hittites.info

Hittite kings
15th-century BC rulers